Makabe may refer to:

Makabe District, Ibaraki, a district in Ibaraki Prefecture, Japan
Makabe, Ibaraki,  a town in Makabe District, Ibaraki Prefecture, Japan
Makabe (surname), a Japanese surname